Maria Full of Grace (Spanish title: María, llena eres de gracia, lit., "Maria, you are full of grace") is a 2004 drama film written and directed by Joshua Marston. The film was produced between Colombia and the United States. The story follows a Colombian girl who becomes a drug mule for a trafficking ring. Lead actress Catalina Sandino Moreno was named Best Actress at the Berlin Film Festival, and was nominated for the Academy Award for Best Actress in the 77th Academy Awards.

Plot
Seventeen-year-old Colombian girl Maria Álvarez works in sweatshop-like conditions at a flower plantation. Her income helps support her family, including an unemployed sister who is a single mother, but after unjust treatment from her boss, she quits her job de-thorning roses, despite her family's vehement disapproval. Shortly thereafter, Maria discovers she is pregnant by her boyfriend, and he suggests marriage, but she declines because she does not feel she loves him, or that he loves her. On her way to Bogotá to find a new job, she is offered a position as a drug mule. Desperate, she accepts the risky offer, and swallows 62 wrapped pellets of drugs, and flies to New York City with her friend Blanca, who has also been recruited as a drug mule.

Maria is almost caught by U.S. customs who are suspicious after finding Maria's $800 in cash and wanting to make a surprise visit to a sister she "hasn't seen in years", but not knowing anywhere else to go if she isn't home. She tells them that the father of her child paid for her plane ticket. She avoids being X-rayed due to her pregnancy, and is released. The traffickers collect Maria, Blanca, and Lucy, another more experienced mule that Maria had befriended during her recruitment. The mules are held in a motel room until they pass all the drug pellets. Lucy falls ill when a drug pellet apparently ruptures inside her. Unknown to the traffickers, Maria witnesses them carrying Lucy out of the hotel room, and she sees blood stains in the bathtub. She comes to the conclusion that the traffickers cut her open to retrieve the other drug pellets inside her body. Scared, Maria convinces Blanca to escape with her while the traffickers are gone. They leave with the drugs they have passed.

Maria has nowhere to sleep, and goes to Lucy's sister's house, but doesn't reveal to the sister that Lucy is dead. Blanca soon joins her there. Eventually the sister unexpectedly hears of their involvement in her sister's death and throws them out. Blanca and Maria make an agreement to return the drugs to the traffickers and receive their money. Maria uses some of her drug money to send Lucy's body home to Colombia for a proper burial. Maria and Blanca are ready to board the plane back to Colombia when Maria decides to stay in the United States. Blanca returns home without Maria.

Cast
 Catalina Sandino Moreno as Maria Álvarez 
 John Álex Toro as Franklin
 Johanna Andrea Mora as Diana Álvarez
 Virginia Ariza as Juana
 Yenny Paola Vega as Blanca
 Guilied Lopez as Lucy Díaz
 Patricia Rae as Carla
 Rodrigo Sánchez Borhorquez as the supervisor
 Charles Albert Patiño as Felipe
 Wilson Guerrero as Juan
 Fabricio Suarez, Mateo Suarez as Pacho
 Evangelina Morales as Rosita
 Juana Guarderas as a pharmacist
 Jaime Osorio Gómez as Javier
 Victor Macias as Pellet maker
 Selenis Leyva as Customs Inspector

Release 
Maria Full of Grace was first shown on 18 January at the Sundance Film Festival in the United States. On 11 February 2004, it was shown at the Berlin Film Festival; launch in Colombia occurred only on 2 April of the same year. The film had a limited release on 16 July 2004, before going wide in the United States on 6 August 2004.

Reception

Critical response
The film was critically acclaimed. It garnered a 97% approval rating on the aggregator site Rotten Tomatoes, based on 146 reviews, and an average rating of 8/10. The website's critical consensus states, "In a striking debut, Moreno carries the movie and puts a human face on the drug trade". On Metacritic, the film has a weighted average score of 87 out of 100, based on 39 critics, indicating "universal acclaim". According to Desson Thomson from The Washington Post, "Catalina Sandino Moreno is a Colombian Mona Lisa, a delicate, unforgettable force majeure. Add to her luminous demeanor a story that rips fleshy holes through your heart and you've got yourself a stunner of a film".

Writing for Rolling Stone, Peter Travers gave the film 3 out of 4 stars, praising Moreno's performance, the screenplay, and Maston's direction, saying: "Remember the name Catalina Sandino Moreno. The heartfelt and harrowing performance she gives here should put her in line for a heap of year-end awards."

The film was nominated to the Golden Bear at the 54th Berlin Film Festival.

Box office
Its total worldwide gross stands at $12,594,630 ($6,529,624 at the American box office, and $6,065,006 from other territories).

Accolades

See also
 Movies depicting Colombia
 List of Colombian films
 Balloon swallowing

References

External links
 
 
 
 
 

2004 films
2004 crime drama films
2004 crime thriller films
2004 directorial debut films
2004 independent films
2000s American films
2000s Spanish-language films
American crime drama films
American crime thriller films
American independent films
Colombian drama films
Colombian independent films
Ecuadorian drama films
English-language Colombian films
English-language Ecuadorian films
2000s English-language films
Films about drugs
Films about the illegal drug trade
Films directed by Joshua Marston
Films set in Colombia
Films set in New York City
Films shot in Colombia
Films shot in Ecuador
Sundance Film Festival award winners
Teenage pregnancy in film